The Kulunda is a river in Altai Krai, Russia.

The basin of the river is located in the Rebrikhinsky, Tyumentsevsky, Bayevsky and Blagoveshchensky districts. There are a number of villages near its banks, such as Bayevo, Pokrovka, Kapustinka, Proslaukha and Gryaznovo.

Course 
The Kulunda river system is an endorheic basin between the Ob and the Irtysh rivers. The sources are in the Ob Plateau. The river flows roughly southwestwards through one of the wide ravines of glacial origin that are characteristic of the plateau. As it descends to the Kulunda Plain there are many lakes in its basin, especially near Andronovo and Nizhnechumanka. Near its mouth the river turns westwards.

Tributaries 

See also
List of rivers of Russia

References

External links
 
 The syntaxonomy of the meadow vegetation of Kulunda and Kasmala pine forest strips (Altai Territory)

Rivers of Altai Krai
West Siberian Plain
Endorheic basins of Asia